This article lists the election results of the 'continuing' Social Democratic Party (SDP), founded by David Owen following the merger of the Liberal Party and original Social Democratic Party, in UK elections.

By-elections

1987-1992 Parliament

Source:

European Parliament elections

1989 European election

Sources:

European Parliament by-elections

Source:

References

Election results by party in the United Kingdom